KUBR (1210 AM, "Radio Cristiana") is a Spanish language Christian radio station that serves the Rio Grande Valley border area. The station broadcasts from San Juan, Texas.

History
The Chapman Broadcasting Company obtained the construction permit for KUBR in 1985 and sold it to Bernal in 1988.

External links

UBR
UBR